Caliagrion is a monotypic genus of damselflies belonging to the family Coenagrionidae.
The single species of this genus, Caliagrion billinghursti,
is commonly known as a large riverdamsel, 
and is endemic to south-eastern Australia,
where it inhabits slow-flowing rivers and ponds.

Caliagrion billinghursti is a large damselfly; the male is coloured bright blue with black, while the female is yellow and black.

Gallery

References

Coenagrionidae
Zygoptera genera
Monotypic Odonata genera
Odonata of Australia
Endemic fauna of Australia
Taxa named by Robert John Tillyard
Insects described in 1913
Damselflies